The Playful Polar Bears is an animated short produced by Fleischer Studios and released by Paramount Pictures on October 28, 1938. It is part of the Color Classics series.

Summary
A polar bear father has to protect one of his children when a group of hunters puts their home in danger.

Reception
Motion Picture Exhibitor (Nov 15, 1938): "Here's a natural for the kids. The Fleischers put Myron Waldman to work turning out one of the best shorts they have made. Three polar bears (one is naturally the "black sheep") cavort in the snow, are chased by hunters. The "black sheep" fails to run to safety, is kayoed by a falliong icicle. Thinking him dead, an effective mourning chant follows. He comes to life, there's great celebration. Excellent."

References

External links
 

Color Classics cartoons
1930s color films
1930s American animated films
1938 animated films
1938 films
Paramount Pictures short films
Fleischer Studios short films
Short films directed by Dave Fleischer
Films about hunters
Animated films about bears